

Menteshe was the first of the  Anatolian beyliks, the frontier principalities established by the Oghuz Turks after the decline of the Seljuk Sultanate of Rum. Founded in 1260/1290, it was named for its founder, . Its capital city was Milas (Mylasa) in southwestern Anatolia.

The heartland of the beylik corresponded roughly to ancient Caria or to the early modern Muğla Province in Turkey, including the province's three protruding peninsulas.  Among the important centers within the beylik were the cities of Beçin, Milas, Balat, Elmalı, Finike, Kaş, Mağrı (modern Fethiye), Muğla, Çameli, Acıpayam, Tavas, Bozdoğan, and Çine.  The city of Aydın (formerly Tralles) was controlled by this beylik for a time, during which it was called "Güzelhisar"; it later was transferred to the Aydinids in the north, who renamed the city for the founder of their dynasty.

The Beylik of Menteshe were serious regional naval powers of their time.  They were sometimes referred to as the Sea Turks as they were the first seafaring Beylik. The Beylik produced fine boats using special trees harvested from the expansive forests in the high coastal mountains. These boats sailed well and were well built and the models for today's Gulet Sailboats, which are prevalent in the Aegean Sea in both Greece and Turkey. The Beylik even conquered Rhodes and many other islands, which are still referred to as the "Menteşe" Islands or the Dodecanese.  During the Siege of Constantinople in 1453, approximately 40% of the Ottoman Navy was from the Menteshe Beylik.  Today, the present-day Mugla continues to be a major shipbuilding region where many luxury yachts are now produced for export.  

Architecturally, the Menteshe Beylik had a significant impact on later Ottoman Architecture. They were the first Beylik to construct large precision cut stone buildings and became experts in building domes and archways. The region itself was an important source of marble and stone since the Roman times and continues to be Turkey's top stone export region. They also left important works of architecture, such as the Firus Bey Mosque in Milas and İlyas Bey Mosque in Balat.

Menteşe Bey first submitted to Ottoman rule in 1390, during the reign of Bayezid I, "the Thunderbolt".  After 1402, Tamerlane restored the beylik to Menteşoğlu İlyas Bey, who recognized Ottoman overlordship in 1414.  A dozen years later, in 1426, Menteshe was incorporated into the Ottoman realm.

The present-day Muğla Province of Turkey was named the sub-province (sanjak) of Menteshe until the early years of the Republic of Turkey, although the provincial seat had been moved from Milas to Muğla with the establishment of Ottoman rule in the 15th century.

List of beys

See also
 List of Sunni Muslim dynasties

References

Sources

External links
 Architecture of the Menteşe period: Firuz Bey Mosque
 Architecture of the Menteşe period: Ilyas Bey Mosque

 
Anatolian beyliks
History of Muğla Province
States and territories established in 1260
1261 establishments in Asia
States and territories disestablished in 1424